Kimmo Koskinen (born 11 March 1948) is a Finnish speed skater. He competed at the 1968 Winter Olympics and the 1972 Winter Olympics.

References

1948 births
Living people
Finnish male speed skaters
Olympic speed skaters of Finland
Speed skaters at the 1968 Winter Olympics
Speed skaters at the 1972 Winter Olympics
Sportspeople from Tampere